Lionel Robert Ashburner    (1827 in Tasmania – 26 January 1907 in Marylebone, London) was the Acting governor of Bombay during the British Raj from 13 March 1880 to 28 April 1880.

Biography
Lionel, son of William Page Ashburner and his wife Hester Maria, was a civil servant in India, where he became a director of the Great Indian Peninsular Railway. In the 1871 Birthday Honours, he was appointed a Companion of the Order of the Star of India.

On 14 July 1873 he married Emily Caroline Haggard at Kirkee, Bombay.

References

Governors of Bombay
1827 births
1907 deaths
Companions of the Order of the Star of India